= Tragia (Naxos) =

Town in ancient Greece

Tragia or Tragaea (Ancient Greek: Τραγία) was a town of ancient Greece on the island of Naxos.

Its site is unlocated.
